Myint Han is a Burmese chess International Master. He is a two-time Myanmar National Chess Championship winner, finishing first in 2016 and 2020.

References

Living people
1962 births
Chess International Masters
Burmese chess players
20th-century Burmese people
21st-century Burmese people